New Puilwa is a village under Peren district of Nagaland, India. It is located in the Peren Circle.Tourist place list Hidden cave of Phizo, Rani Cave, Water fall (Nkwareuki), Barack river, etc.

Demographics 

According to the 2011 census of India, New Puilwa has 52 households. The effective literacy rate (i.e. the literacy rate of population excluding children aged 6 and below) is 82.25%.

References 

Villages in Peren Circle